La Grosse Décharge Ouest is a tributary of the west bank of the upper part of the rivière des Mares, flowing entirely in the town of Baie-Saint-Paul, in the Charlevoix Regional County Municipality, in the administrative region of Capitale-Nationale, in the province from Quebec, to Canada.

This valley is mainly served by the Seminary path which runs along the south side of this watercourse. Forestry is the main economic activity in this valley; recreational tourism, second.

The surface of La Grosse Décharge Ouest is generally frozen from the beginning of December until the beginning of April; however, safe circulation on the ice is generally done from mid-December to the end of March. The water level of the river varies with the seasons and the precipitation; the spring flood generally occurs in April.

Geography 
The Grosse Décharge Ouest rises at the mouth of Côté lake. The mouth of this lake is located at:
  north of Lac Croche;
  north-east of the course of the Sainte-Anne River;
  west of the mouth of the rivière des Mares (confluence with the rivière du Gouffre);
  west of downtown Baie-Saint-Paul.

  towards the south-east down the mountain in a deep valley, to a stream (coming from the south-west);
  to the east in a deep valley up to a bend in the river;
  to the east in a deep valley, collecting two streams (each coming from the southwest), to La Grosse Décharge Est (coming from the northwest);
  north-east in a deep valley, to its mouth.

The Grosse Décharge Ouest pours into a bend on the west bank of the Mares river in Baie-Saint-Paul. This mouth is located at:
  north-east of the forest road;
  north-west of the village center of Saint-Placide-Nord
  west of downtown Baie-Saint-Paul;
  north-west of the confluence of the Gouffre river and the Saint-Laurent river.

Toponymy 
This toponymic designation appears on the map "Domaine forestier du Séminaire de Québec", 1955-01.

The toponym "La Grosse Décharge Ouest" was formalized on March 25, 1997 at the Place Names Bank of the Commission de toponymie du Québec.

Notes and references

Appendices

Related articles 
 Charlevoix Regional County Municipality
 Baie-Saint-Paul, a city
 La Grosse Décharge Est
 Rivière des Mares (Gouffre River tributary)
 Rivière du Gouffre
 St. Lawrence River
 List of rivers of Quebec

External links 

Rivers of Capitale-Nationale
Charlevoix Regional County Municipality